John Marsham may refer to:
 Sir John Marsham, 1st Baronet, English antiquary
 Sir John Marsham, 2nd Baronet (1637–1692), of the Marsham baronets
 Sir John Marsham, 3rd Baronet (1679–1696), of the Marsham baronets
 John Marsham (cricketer), English clergyman and amateur cricketer